Nazko may refer to:

Nazko, a community in the Central Interior region of British Columbia
Nazko Cone, a volcano in the Central Interior of British Columbia, Canada
Nazko River, a river in the Central Interior of British Columbia
Nazko First Nation